Şemsettin Mardin was one of the Turkish ambassadors.

Biography
Mardin was born in Egypt. He was a member of very long-established family. He was uncle to Arif Mardin and Betul Mardin.

He served as the ambassador of Turkey to Lebanon from 1960 to 1962. He married Reya Hanim, daughter of Ahmed Cevdet who founded the daily Ikdam. Their son, Şerif Mardin, was an academic. After retiring from diplomatic post, Şemsettin Mardin settled in Maadi, a district of Cairo and died there.

References

20th-century Turkish diplomats
Ambassadors of Turkey to Lebanon
Diplomats from Cairo
Turkish expatriates in Egypt